American bachata band Aventura has released six studio albums, three live albums, two video albums, 15 music videos and 26 singles.

As Los Tinellers

Studio albums

Live albums

Greatest Hits or Compilation

Singles

Main singles

Promo singles and other charted songs

Featured singles

Collaborations
"We Got The Crown" with Tego Calderón

"Ella y Yo" featuring Don Omar

"Ciego de Amor" featuring Anthony Santos "El Mayimbe"

"You're Lying" featuring Nina Sky

"Noche de Sexo" with Wisin & Yandel

"Pam Pam (Remix)" with Wisin & Yandel

"Los Infieles (Remix)" featuring Frankie J

"Me Voy (Remix)" with Héctor Acosta

"El Perdedor (Remix)" featuring Ken-Y

"Spanish Fly" featuring Ludacris and Wyclef Jean

"All Up 2 You" featuring Akon and Wisin & Yandel

Videography

Music Videos
"Cuando Volverás" - 5:44 (1999) 
"Obsesión" (featuring Judy Santos) - 4:13 (2002) 
"Obsesión" (2nd Music Video) - 3:04 (2003) Judy was not included even though her voice was on the video. 
"Hermanita" - 5:18 (2003) 
"La Boda" - 5:11 (2005) 
"Un Beso" - 4:42 (2005) 
"Ella & Yo" (featuring Don Omar) - 4:32 (2005) 
"Los Infieles" - 4:30 (2006) 
"Mi Corazoncito" - 3:55 (2007) 
"El Perdedor" - 3:48 (2008)  
"Por Un Segundo" - 5:09 (2009) 
"All Up 2 You" (featuring Akon, Wisin & Yandel) - 5:15 (2009) 
"Su Veneno (Bolero Version)" - 3:49 (2009) 
"Su Veneno (Bachata Version)" - 4:07 (2009) 
"Dile Al Amor" - 3:50 (2009) 
"El Malo" - 5:46 (2010) 
"Inmortal" - 4:35 (2019) 
"Volví" - 3:51 (2021)

Concert Films and Music Video Albums
Aventura In Concert: Sold Out at The United Palace (2003)
 We Broke The Rules (DVD) (2004)
The Love & Hate Concert: Live at the United Palace (2005)
Kings of Bachata: Sold Out at Madison Square Garden (2007)
14 + 14 (2011)

Notes

References

External links
Official site
Aventura Biography with music and video clips

Discographies of American artists
Tropical music discographies
Contemporary R&B discographies
Discography

de:Aventura (Band)
fr:Aventura
it:Aventura
nl:Aventura
fi:Aventura
sv:Aventura
tr:Aventura